Racism in Thailand is a prevalent problem but is only infrequently publicly discussed. The United Nations (UN) does not define "racism"; however, it does define "racial discrimination": According to the 1965 UN International Convention on the Elimination of All Forms of Racial Discrimination, "...the term "racial discrimination" shall mean any distinction, exclusion, restriction, or preference based on race, colour, descent, or national or ethnic origin that has the purpose or effect of nullifying or impairing the recognition, enjoyment or exercise, on an equal footing, of human rights and fundamental freedoms in the political, economic, social, cultural or any other field of public life." Thailand has made two submissions to the Convention, with ongoing issues including government policy towards ethnic groups, especially the Thai Malays, and the country's lack of racial discrimination legislation.

Ethnic minority issues
Thailand's ethnic minorities have been subjected to persecution in Thailand, especially the one million plus members of Thailand's hill tribes. They are frequently viewed as illiterate drug peddlers and opium-growers, with Thai mainstream media perpetuating this image. A 2013 article in the Bangkok Post said, "Nearly a million hill peoples and forest dwellers are still treated as outsiders—criminals even, since most live in protected forests. Viewed as national security threats, hundreds of thousands of them are refused citizenship although many are natives to the land". According to Dr Chayan Vaddanaputti of Chiang Mai University, this was not always the case:

"Earlier, they were seen by ordinary people in the lowlands as friends and trading partners in a mutually symbiotic relationship between the hills and the valleys. But growing environmental problems after Thailand's national social and economic development plans took off in the late '60s and early '70s, and an influx of Vietnamese migrants during the Vietnam War changed this relationship forever. Then they became the enemies, the 'other'. The demonization and criminalization of ethnic minorities and the perpetuation of the myth that they are non-Thai has been embedded in Thai textbooks, in Thai history and in the mainstream media."

Extrajudicial killings, torture, disappearances, and intimidation of members of Thailand's hill tribes by Thai police and military was rampant under Prime Minister Thaksin Shinawatra's "War on Drugs", which started in 2003.

The Muslim Malay Patani Kingdom of southern Thailand was incorporated into the Thai state in 1785. Being called khaek ('foreigner' or 'guest'), the Thai Malays were subjected to discrimination and political suppression, especially during the regimes of Field Marshal Plaek Phibunsongkhram and the Thaification policies of the mid-20th century. The south Thailand insurgency of the past 10 years, has repeatedly been met with brutal force by successive Thai governments, especially under the Thaksin Shinawatra administration.

Thai Chinese also have had to bear xenophobic sentiment in the past. Besides having had their language and writing suppressed during the Thaification period of the mid-20th century, those of Chinese descent were also required to change their surnames to Thai names. As a result, many younger generations of ethnic Chinese can only communicate in Thai and self-identify solely as Thai.

Light skin, dark skin
As in much of Asia, dark skin is equated with outdoor labor conditions and the lower classes. Thai culture shares this skin-tone bias with the rest of Asia. In Thailand, this bias is exacerbated by the fact that many of the wealthy Thais in Bangkok are of Chinese descent and have naturally lighter skin than the indigenous Thais from the countryside. There are no laws within the Kingdom of Thailand which outlaws racial discrimination inclusive of racist cliches known in the Western world. Unlike its neighboring nations which have been under colonialism, Thailand's heritage as an uncolonized state also shaped its existing laws unlike its Westernized counterparts after decolonization. This also includes signage promoting racial segregation as was common in the southern United States prior to the Civil Rights Act of 1964 and South Africa under apartheid. A Dunkin Donuts blackface ad aired on Thai television in 2013, causing a stir in Western media, was met for the most part with incomprehension in Thailand. The ad, says Thai cultural commentator Kaewmala, may be controversial, but "it's not a comment on black people in general, it's about concepts of beauty and social snobbery in Asia."

As most Thai people traditionally have never encountered people of African descent, prejudice toward and stereotypes of people of African descent were absorbed by Thais through the Vietnam War and literature and then movies from the West. Common brands featuring people of African descent include mops, toilet brushes, and tooth paste.

Although Thailand has incorporated certain Western ideals concerning beauty, Asian attitudes regarding skin tones have been around for a long time. Prior to contact with the West, Indian culture permeated the early civilizations of Southeast Asia, which possibly included the ideal of fair skin over darker skin. The 20 million strong Isan population, for instance, many of whom are of Laotian and Khmer descent, traditionally had darker skin and studies show that many view themselves as less desirable than those with lighter skin. Skin whitening products have proven increasingly popular in most of Asia, including Thailand and are marketed in such a way as to promote light skin as beautiful and desirable.

Yukti Mukdawijitra, a Thammasat University anthropology professor, observes that the idea that light skin is good and dark skin is bad is "embedded in Thai culture".

Xenophobia
Thai attitudes towards Burma have been formed by the Thai ethnocentric media of the 1990s and a nationalistic school system, which teaches that Burma is Thailand's traditional enemy, based on repeated wars between the two from the 16th century CE onward. This negative view was further popularized in novels and films, presenting heroic Thais fighting against villainous Burmese invaders. Examples of recent films that portray this are Bang Rajan (2000), The Legend of Suriyothai (2001), King Naresuan (film series, 2007 onwards), and Siyama (2008).

Thailand has had long standing racial issues with Middle Easterners and other Asians, who collectively are also called khaek, meaning "foreigner" or "guest". "There is some debate as to whether the meaning of foreigner / visitor entrenches prejudices against Malay Muslims and Muslims more generally".

The condemnation of the 2014 Thai coup d'état by countries such as the US and Australia have given rise to an "anti-foreigner sentiment" with those Thais who are in favor of the coup. In March 2012, Ombudsman Prof. Siracha Charoenpanij, a public advocate appointed by the government, blamed foreigners for the difficulties that Thais faced in owning land, incorrectly claiming that a third of the land area of Thailand, some 100 million rai or 160,000 km2 of premium land, primarily in established beach resorts, was now owned by non-Thais through proxy, and obtained through corruption and the use of legal loopholes. The National Institute of Development Administration supposedly provided these numbers.

Due to an increase of Russian and Eastern European tourists in Phuket, Russians have also been the target of xenophobia, with protests and banners saying "Russians Get Out" in Phuket, and "a taxi blockade over suspected Russian transport drivers; illegal shops and businesses".  Other issues include the Singapore Tourism Board organising a Songkran festival in Singapore without the endorsement of either Thai expats in Singapore, or sponsorship from the Thai authorities. Singapore was accused of "stealing 'our' (Thailand's) Songkran", with Thai officials threatening lawsuits.
 
In 2014, Thai officials cracked down on Chinese tourists visiting the campus of Chiang Mai University due to their using buses reserved for students, attending lectures, and eating at the student cafeteria. Anti-Khmer sentiment, already high due to border clashes over the Preah Vihear temple, has been fanned by Suthep Thaugsuban, a Yellow Shirt leader.

References

 
Thailand
Thailand
Human rights abuses in Thailand